The West Lake Museum is a museum in Hangzhou, China  concerning aspects of the West Lake. There are four main exhibition areas in the hall introducing the amongst others the landscape, humanity and historical influence of the West Lake.

Exhibition area
The museum covers an area of 20144 square meters with its principal part being 7920 square meters. Three-fourths of the structure is underground and the structure area above ground is only 1980 square meters. A large area of the museum uses the steel frame glass structure which is good to gather light.

In the museum, the exhibition hall covers an area of 2875 square meters and the exhibition length is up to 310 meters. There are altogether 516 pictures and 389 items on display.

The West Lake Museum was open to the public in October, 2005. Now, it is free for everyone to visit it.

References

External links
 Official website (in Chinese)
 The Introduction of West Lake Museum

Museums in Hangzhou
Local museums in China